Afoji is a town in Moyo District, in the Northern Region of Uganda.

Location
The geographical coordinates of Afoji are 03°42'13.0"N, 31°40'36.0"E (Latitude:3.703609; Longitude:31.676658).

Overview
The Atiak–Adjumani–Moyo–Afoji Road, facilitates trade and the movement of people between Uganda and South Sudan.

References

External links
 Planned Infrastructure Projects Between Uganda And South Sudan

Populated places in Northern Region, Uganda
South Sudan–Uganda border crossings
Moyo District
West Nile sub-region